Abhinav Gomatam is an Indian actor who appears in Telugu films.

Early life 
Abhinav Gomatam was born and brought up in Hyderabad. He is an engineering graduate from Vignan Institute of Technology and Science.

Career 
He started his career with theater. He worked at Lamakaan, UDAAN Performing Arts (Promoted by UDAAN Academy Of Arts And Education) and Aham Theatre. He worked in several short films and moved to Telugu cinema. His more recent film credits are Malli Raava (2017), Ee Nagaraniki Emaindhi (2018), Sita (2019), Falaknuma Das (2019) and Meeku Maathrame Cheptha (2019). A Cinema Express review lauded Gomatam's performance in Meeku Maathrame Cheptha, while dismissing the film overall. He also received praise for his starring role in Ee Nagaraniki Emaindhi.

Filmography
All films are in Telugu, unless otherwise noted.

References

External links 

 

Living people
Year of birth missing (living people)
Telugu male actors
21st-century Indian male actors
Indian male film actors
Male actors from Hyderabad, India
Male actors in Telugu cinema